|}

The Johnny Henderson Grand Annual Chase is a Premier Handicap National Hunt steeplechase in Great Britain which is open to horses aged five years or older. It is run on the Old Course at Cheltenham over a distance of about 2 miles (1 mile 7 furlongs and 199 yards, or 3,199 metres), and during its running there are fourteen fences to be jumped. It is a handicap race, and it is scheduled to take place each year during the Cheltenham Festival in March.

History
The Grand Annual is the oldest race at the Festival, and it is also the oldest chase in the present National Hunt calendar. It was first run in April 1834, and it was initially contested over three miles of open country at Andoversford, near Cheltenham. The race was discontinued in the 1860s, but it was revived at the turn of the century. During the early 1900s it took place at several different venues, including Melton Mowbray, Leicester and Warwick. It returned to Cheltenham in 1913.

The name of Johnny Henderson (1920–2003), a banker and racehorse owner, was added to the race's title in 2005. Henderson, the father of trainer Nicky, realized in the early 1960s that the racecourse at Cheltenham was attracting the interest of property developers. To safeguard its future, and that of the Festival, Henderson and other Jockey Club members formed the Racecourse Holdings Trust, and raised £240,000 to purchase the venue.

The running order of the races at the Cheltenham Festival was altered slightly in 2009, and the Johnny Henderson Grand Annual Chase became the last event on the final day. A further change for the 2019 meeting moved the race to become the penultimate race on the final day, switching places with the Martin Pipe Conditional Jockeys' Handicap Hurdle. The maximum number of runners in the race was reduced from 24 to 20 from the 2019 running after a British Horseracing Authority (BHA) review into fatalities at the Cheltenham Festival; the 2018 running of the Grand Annual had seen three horses suffer fatal injuries. In 2021 another change in the Festival running order saw the Grand Annual moved to the second day of the meeting and therefore switch from Cheltenham's New Course to the Old Course.  The race held Grade 3 status until 2022 and was re-classified as a Premier Handicap from the 2023 running when Grade 3 status was renamed by the BHA.

Records
Most successful horse since 1946 (2 wins):
 Top Twenty – 1958, 1959
 Dulwich – 1974, 1976

Leading jockey since 1946 (4 wins):
 Graham Bradley – Pearlyman (1986), My Young Man (1992), Sound Reveille (1995), Uncle Ernie (1997)

Leading trainer since 1946 (4 wins):
 Paul Nicholls – St Pirran (2004), Andreas (2007), Solar Impulse (2016), Le Prezien (2018)

Winners since 1946
 Weights given in stones and pounds.

See also
 Horse racing in Great Britain
 List of British National Hunt races
 Recurring sporting events established in 1834  – this race is included under its former title, Grand Annual Chase.

References

 Racing Post:

 pedigreequery.com – Grand Annual Chase – Cheltenham.
 racenewsonline.co.uk – Racenews Archive (21 February 2008).
 

National Hunt races in Great Britain
Cheltenham Racecourse
National Hunt chases
1834 establishments in England